The 1980–81 Cornell Big Red men's basketball team represented Cornell University during the 1980–81 college men's basketball season. The team finished with a final record of 7–19, 4—10, and they finished 6th in the Ivy League. This was coach Tom Miller's first season at Cornell.

Roster

Schedule

References 

Cornell
Cornell Big Red men's basketball seasons
Cornell
Cornell